The Ten Precepts of Taoism were outlined in a short text that appears in Dunhuang manuscripts (DH31, 32), the Scripture of the Ten Precepts (Shíjiè jīng 十戒經). The precepts are the classical rules of medieval Taoism as applied to practitioners attaining the rank of Disciple of Pure Faith (qīngxīn dìzǐ 清心弟子). They first appeared in the Scripture on Setting the Will on Wisdom (Zhìhuì dìngxīn jīng 智慧定心經) (DZ325).

There is one rule that is divided into Ten Precepts. That rule is the Tao (or Dao).

The Precepts
1. Don’t harbor hatred or jealousy in your heart.

Don’t give rise to dark thieving thoughts.

Be reserved in speech and wary of transgressions.

Keep your thoughts on the Divine Law.

2. Maintain a kind heart and do not kill.

Have pity for and support all living beings.

Be compassionate and loving.

Broadly reach out to bring universal redemption to all.

3. Maintain purity and be withdrawing in your social interactions.

Be neither lascivious nor thieving, but constantly harbor good thoughts.

Always take from yourself to aid others.

4. Don’t set your mind on sexual desire or give rise to passion.

Be not licentious in your heart but remain pure and behave prudently.

Make sure your actions are without blemish or stain.

5. Don’t utter bad words.

Don’t use flowery and ornate language.

Be straightforward within and without.

Don’t commit excesses of speech.

6. Don’t take liquor or drug.

Moderate your behavior.

Regulate and harmonize your energy and inner nature.

Don’t let your spirit be diminished.

Don’t commit any of the myriad evils.

7. Don’t be envious if others are better than yourself.

Don’t contend for achievement and fame.

Be retiring and modest in all things.

Put yourself behind to serve the salvation of others.

8. Don’t criticize or debate the scriptures and teachings.

Don’t revile or slander the saintly texts.

Venerate the Divine Law with all your heart.

Always act as if you were face to face with the gods and immortals.

9. Don’t create disturbance through verbal argumentation.

Don’t criticize any believers, be they monks, nuns, male or female laity,

or even heavenly beings. Remember, all censure and hate diminishes your spirit and energy.

10. Be equanimous and of whole heart in all of your actions.

Make sure that all exchanges between humankind

and the divine gods are proper and respectful.

See also
The Taoist Five Precepts
The Buddhist Five Precepts
The Buddhist Eight Precepts

References

Chinese philosophy
Taoist philosophy
Taoist ethics
Codes of conduct
Cultural lists